Adventures in Your Own Backyard is the fourth studio album by Canadian musician Patrick Watson, released in April 2012. It is the band's follow-up to the Polaris Music Prize-nominated 2009 release Wooden Arms, but by comparison is a musically simpler and more emotional album.

Recording and production
Adventures in Your Own Backyard was recorded almost entirely in a home studio next door to Watson's apartment in the Plateau neighbourhood of Montreal, Quebec. The location was chosen for several reasons: the band wanted to return to the city after several years of touring, they felt that they would produce their best work by avoiding the time constraint and stress of recording in a professional studio, and it also allowed Watson to care for his two young children in between recording sessions. According to drummer Robbie Kuster, the relaxed and informal environment "really let [the band] dig in to the writing and the arranging" of the album. However, the album's title refers to more than just the physical location of where it was recorded; as Watson explains,

Though the band is named after its lead singer, Watson, he maintains that "when people say 'Patrick Watson' I don’t think of me... I think of an entity" and has cited the track "Morning Sheets" as an example of a song whose tune was written by someone else (Kuster and Mishka Stein).

Release
In 2011, the band had already revealed that they planned to release an album sometime in the next year, but the title, track listing, release dates and tour dates were not officially announced until January 25, 2012. The track "Into Giants" was also released for streaming online and later officially made available for purchase as a single on February 21, 2012. In anticipation of the album's release, American music magazine Paste named Patrick Watson one of "10 International Acts to Watch for in 2012".

On March 15, the band played at the South by Southwest (SXSW) music festival in Austin, Texas, where Rolling Stone magazine named them among the 25 "can't-miss acts" of the festival. National Public Radio hosts Bob Boilen and Robin Hilton were in attendance and reacted very favourably to the band's performance; Hilton was moved to tears by what he called a "magical" moment that was his "most profound... of the day", while Boilen called it the best show of the festival and predicted the album would be one of the best of 2012.

The album's launch was supported by three sold-out concerts at the Corona Theatre in Montreal on April 15, 16, and 17. A music video for "Into Giants", directed by Brigitte Henry, was released on April 24, 2012.

Web series

To accompany the album, the band will release a series of web videos described by Watson as a collection of "stories in people's backyards". The videos will combine musical performances as well as documentary elements and are inspired by American filmmaker David Lynch's 2009 web series Interview Project. The first video, released on April 16, was shot in Rouyn-Noranda, Quebec during the Emerging Music Festival (French: Festival de musique émergente) in September 2011. It features an interview with a local restaurateur Conrad Morasse as well as a small outdoor concert by the town's train tracks.

Release history

Music and lyrics

The songs of Adventures in Your Own Backyard are described as "boisterous and pretty, alive and roaming, fairytales with Watson’s skimming falsetto", and continue in the band's signature style of cinematic and orchestral pop. Like the band's previous release, Wooden Arms, the album contains a few unusual instruments, including a glass marimba on one track, but in general features less of the experimental sound, opting instead for "an eloquent, perhaps deceptive, simplicity" and more mature production. According to Watson, the album is much subtler and "a bit more grounded, less airy... still kind of dreamy but with its feet on the ground", and he expressed a desire for his audience to focus more on the emotions behind the music than simply on the instruments used in its creation. He also expressed a certain dissatisfaction with the previous album, saying that singing its songs didn't give him the "melodic goosebumps", and for this album wanted to write songs that just "felt really good to sing".

Writing for The Globe and Mail, music critic Brad Wheeler noted the band's stylistic changes, calling Adventures in Your Own Backyard "a dreamy bath of chamber-pop and fancy cabaret, less clacky without the kitchen-utensil or bike-wheel percussion of Wooden Arms and slightly more grounded than Close to Paradise". It was also described by another critic as a "pensive and downtempo affair", with "slow-burning melodies [that] take entire songs to ignite memorable hooks".

Thematically, the album was inspired by the concept of home, and especially the group's native province of Quebec. The track "Strange Crooked Road" contains stories from the family of a friend of the band, while "Words in the Fire" was written at a campfire in northern Quebec. In addition, the album's lyrics were intended to provoke the listener into taking a second look at the world around them, which Watson explains by saying,

Reception

Adventures in Your Own Backyard mostly received positive reviews from critics. Olivier Robillard Laveaux of Voir called it "magnificent" and "a success in every way", while Bernard Perusse of The Gazette called it "another haunting, atmospheric gem that doesn’t base its resonance on singsong hooks" and "somewhat unsettling, often dreamlike, but never predictable and always challenging". Jian Ghomeshi of the CBC Radio One show Q called it a "really beautiful record" and predicted that it would garner the band a lot of attention.

However, Dave Simpson of The Guardian gave the album a mixed review, calling it "pretty stuff, with breathtaking production which doesn't quite conceal a shortage of strong songs" and saying that the album "doesn't land enough killer blows". This opinion was echoed by Chris Bilton of The Grid, who said that though the album contains "worthy sonic adventures", few of them are "memorable enough to get stuck in your head".

The album was named as a longlisted nominee for the 2012 Polaris Music Prize on June 14, 2012.

Commercial performance
Adventures in Your Own Backyard was the top-selling album on the Canadian iTunes Store for the week ending on April 22. The album debuted at number two on the Canadian Albums Chart with 14,670 copies sold. On June 28, 2012, the album was certified gold by Music Canada, for shipping over 40,000 copies nationwide.

Track listing
 "Lighthouse" – 4:46
 "Blackwind" – 3:54
 "Step Out for a While" – 4:03
 "The Quiet Crowd" – 3:56
 "Into Giants" – 4:28
 "Morning Sheets" – 3:24
 "Words in the Fire" – 3:53
 "The Things You Do" – 3:58
 "Strange Crooked Road" – 3:43
 "Noisy Sunday" – 4:01
 "Adventures in Your Own Backyard" – 4:51
 "Swimming Pools" – 2:54

 iTunes Store bonus track

 "The Things We Do" – 4:44

Personnel
 Simon Angell – guitar
 Robbie Kuster – drums
 Mishka Stein – bass
 Patrick Watson – vocals, piano

References

External links
 Official website

2012 albums
Domino Recording Company albums
Patrick Watson (musician) albums